Herstory is a 2018 South Korean drama film directed by Min Kyu-dong. Based on the real-life story of the trials that took place in Shimonoseki in the 1990s, the film follows a group of Busan-based women who engaged in a court case against the Japanese government to highlight the ordeals of Korean women
who were forced into sexual slavery as comfort women by the Japanese military during World War II.

The film was released in theaters on June 27, 2018.

Cast

Kim Hee-ae as Moon Jung-sook 
Kim Hae-sook as Bae Jung-gil
Ye Soo-jung as Park Soon-nyeo
Moon Sook as Seo Gwi-soon
Lee Yong-nyeo as Lee Ok-joo 
Kim Sun-young as President Shin
Kim Jun-han as Lee Sang-il
Lee Yong-lee as Yoo So-deuk 
Jung In-gi as Choi
Choi Byung-mo as Soon-mo
Lee Seol as Hye-soo
Lee Ji-ha as Director
Kim In-woo as Presiding judge
Yokouchi Hiroki as Japanese prosecutor
Park Myung-shin as Jung Dae-hyeob 
Lee Ji-ha as President Lee
Tasuku Yamanouchi as Consulate officer Abe
Kim Lee-woo as Lawyer Hashimoto Shinobu
Ri Min as Taxi driver 1
Son Kang-gook as Nanjing guide
Oh Chang-kyung as Taxi driver 2
Kim Hye-joon as Hye-soo's companion
Lee Yoo-young as Ryu Seon-yeong (cameo)
Han Ji-min as Teacher (cameo)
Song Young-chang as Busan mayor (cameo)
Jin Seon-kyu as Photographer (voice cameo)
Park Jung-ja as Mrs. Hong (special appearance)
Ahn Se-ha as Taxi driver 3 (special appearance)
Jeong Ha-dam as Rental apartment newlywed bride (special appearance)
Kim Yong-shin as Radio TV announcer (voice cameo)

Awards and nominations

References

External links

 

2018 films
2018 drama films
2010s Japanese-language films
2010s Korean-language films
Drama films based on actual events
Films about comfort women
Films directed by Min Kyu-dong
Next Entertainment World films
South Korean drama films
South Korean films based on actual events
World War II war crimes trials films
2010s South Korean films